sn-Glycerol 3-phosphate is the organic ion with the formula HOCH2CH(OH)CH2OPO32-.  It is one of three stereoisomers of the ester of dibasic phosphoric acid (HOPO32-) and glycerol.  It is a component of glycerophospholipids.  From a historical reason, it is also known as -glycerol 3-phosphate, -glycerol 1-phosphate, -α-glycerophosphoric acid.

Biosynthesis 
Glycerol 3-phosphate is synthesized by reducing dihydroxyacetone phosphate (DHAP), an intermediate in glycolysis.  The reduction is catalyzed by glycerol-3-phosphate dehydrogenase. DHAP and thus glycerol 3-phosphate can also be synthesized from amino acids and citric acid cycle intermediates via the glyceroneogenesis pathway.
 + NAD(P)H + H+ →  + NAD(P)+

It is also synthesized by the phosphorylation of glycerol, which is generated by hydrolysis of fats.  This esterification is catalyzed by glycerol kinase.
 + ATP →  + ADP

Metabolism and biological function

Glycerol 3-phosphate is a starting material for de novo synthesis of glycerolipids. In eukaryotes, it is first acylated on its sn-1 position by an ER- or mitochondrial membrane enzyme, glycerol-3-phosphate O-acyltransferase.  A second acyl group is subsequently installed on the sn-2 position making phosphatidic acids.
 + Acyl-CoA → Lysophosphatidic acid + CoA

Glycerol-1-phosphatase catalyzes the hydrolysis of glycerol 3-phosphate to regenerate glycerol, allowing glycerol fermentation to produce glycerol from glucose through glycolysis pathway.  A number of organisms express this enzyme. 
 + H2O →  + Pi

Shuttle system 

Glycerol-3-phosphate dehydrogenases are located both in the cytosol and the intermembrane face of mitochondrial inner membrane. Glycerol 3-phosphate (G3P) and dihydroxyacetone phosphate (DHAP) are molecules so small that they can permeate the mitochondrial outer membrane through porins and shuttle between two dehydrogenases. Using this shuttle system, NADH generated by cytosolic metabolisms including glycolysis is reoxidized to NAD+ reducing DHAP to G3P, and the reducing equivalent can be used for generating a proton gradient across the mitochondrial inner membrane by coupling and oxidizing G3P and reducing quinone.

The Glycerol 3-phosphate shuttle is an emergency back-up system to supply neurons' demand of energy.

Dephosphorylation 

Glycerol-3-phosphate was found to be a substrate for the enzyme phosphoglycolate phosphatase (PGP, or G3PP) in mammals in 2015. G3PP activity has subsequently been suggested to have a regulatory role in central metabolism and stress response.

Glycerol 1-phosphate 
Glycerol 1-phosphate, sometimes called as -glycerol 3-phosphate, is the enantiomer of glycerol 3-phosphate. Most higher organisms use the 3-phosphate, or -configuration, for glycerolipid backbone.  The 1-phosphate is specifically found in archeal lipids.

Notes 

Vicinal diols
Organophosphates
Glycerol esters
Phosphate esters